Scott Lake is a natural lake in Aurora County, South Dakota, in the United States.

Scott Lake has the name of B. E. Scott, a pioneer who settled there.

See also
List of lakes in South Dakota

References

Lakes of South Dakota
Lakes of Aurora County, South Dakota